Eastmont High School, locally referred to as Eastmont or EHS, is a three-year public high school located in East Wenatchee, Washington, USA. The school has 1,457 students in grades 10-12.

The school mascot is a Wildcat. The school colors are Bright red and Columbia blue.

Athletics
Eastmont High School offers a variety of sports, clubs, and activities for students to participate in throughout the school year. Sports offered include:

Fall: cross country, football, volleyball, girls' soccer, girls' swimming
Winter: basketball, wrestling, girls' bowling, boys' swimming
Spring: baseball, softball, track, golf, boys' soccer, tennis, office chair races

Other activities
Future Farmers of America (FFA) is for students interested in agricultural studies.
Cheerleading is for students interested in cheering, stunts, and tumbling at school sports games.
Student Council is for students interested in learning leadership skills while working with the school administration.
Various bands and choirs

References

External links
District home page

High schools in Douglas County, Washington
Public high schools in Washington (state)